Women's College, established in 1937, is an undergraduate and postgraduate women's college in Kolkata, West Bengal, India. It is affiliated by the University of Calcutta.

Departments

Science
Chemistry
Mathematics
Geography 
Psychology
Food and Nutrition
Zoology

Arts
Bengali
English
Sanskrit
Hindi
History
Political Science
Philosophy
Economics
Education
Journalism and Mass Communication
Sociology
Music

Accreditation
Recently, Women's College, Calcutta has been awarded B++ grade by the National Assessment and Accreditation Council (NAAC). The college is also recognized by the University Grants Commission (UGC).

See also 
List of colleges affiliated to the University of Calcutta
Education in India
Education in West Bengal

References

External links
Women’s College

  

Educational institutions established in 1937
University of Calcutta affiliates
Universities and colleges in Kolkata
Women's universities and colleges in West Bengal
1937 establishments in India